Geoforecasting is the science of predicting the movement of tectonic plates and the future climate, shape, and other geological elements of the planet.

Geoforecasting is particularly important in the siting of depositories for radioactive materials.  It also is useful in other areas with long term management issues such as water management.

Notes

External links
 http://www.cbc.ca/quirks/archives/06-07/jan20.html CBC podcast on geoforecasting
 http://www.scotese.com/ Paleomap project
 http://antwrp.gsfc.nasa.gov/apod/ap070922.html Pangea Ultima: Earth in 250 Million Years?

Plate tectonics
Geological techniques